The 1998 election was held on November 3. Democratic incumbent Carl McCall defeated Republican challenger Bruce Blakeman by a wide margin:

General election

Polling

References

See also

Comptroller
1998
New York